Staff and Educational Development Association (SEDA) is the professional association for staff and educational developers in the United Kingdom, promoting innovation and good practice in higher education. SEDA was created in 1993.

SEDA's activities are clustered into five main areas:

 Professional development
 Conferences and events
 Publications
 Research
 Services to members

Professional recognition 

 Fellow of the Staff and Educational Association (FSEDA)
 Associate Fellow of the Staff and Educational Association (AFSEDA)

SEDA accredits (recognises) professional development programs for all types of faculty and staff working in higher education institutions in the UK, and a few outside the UK. It does this through its Professional Development Framework which includes 16 "named awards" aimed at different roles or activities, which have different "specialist outcomes" but share common professional values and developmental outcomes.

See also 
 List of post-nominal letters

References

External links
Official website

Educational institutions established in 1993
Higher education organisations based in the United Kingdom
1993 establishments in the United Kingdom